Nelligan is a provincial electoral district in the Montreal region of Quebec, Canada that elects members to the National Assembly of Quebec. It comprises most of the Pierrefonds-Roxboro borough and all of the L'Île-Bizard–Sainte-Geneviève borough of Montreal, and the city of Kirkland.

It was created for the 1981 election from parts of Pointe-Claire and Robert-Baldwin electoral districts.

In the change from the 2001 to the 2011 electoral map, it lost Senneville to the Jacques-Cartier electoral district but gained from it the part of Kirkland that it did not already have. It also lost a small part of Pierrefonds-Roxboro to the Robert-Baldwin electoral district.

It was named after the noted Quebec poet Émile Nelligan.

Linguistic demographics

Anglophone:34.5%
Francophone: 33.5%
Allophone:32.1%

Members of the National Assembly

Election results

* Result compared to Action démocratique

* Increase is from UFP

|-
 
|CANADA!
|Paul Daoussis
|align="right"|447
|align="right"|1.02
|align="right"|–
|-

|Economic
|Claudette Benoit
|align="right"|292
|align="right"|0.67
|align="right"|–
|-

|Natural Law
|Michael Oliver
|align="right"|276
|align="right"|0.63
|align="right"|–

|}

|-
 
|New Democrat
|Jean-Paul Rioux
|align="right"|664
|align="right"|1.92
|align="right"|-1.59
|-

|Independent
|Alexandre Kisak
|align="right"|367
|align="right"|1.06
|align="right"|–
|}

|-
 
|New Democrat
|Joan Eyolfson Cadham
|align="right"|1,123
|align="right"|3.51
|align="right"|–
|-

|Progressive Conservative
|Richard K. Kendall
|align="right"|798
|align="right"|2.49
|align="right"|–
|}

|Freedom of Choice
|Donovan James Carter
|align="right"|324	
|align="right"|1.03
|}

References

External links
Information
 Elections Quebec

Election results
 Election results (National Assembly)
 Election results (QuébecPolitique)

Maps
 2011 map (PDF)
 2001 map (Flash)
2001–2011 changes (Flash)
1992–2001 changes (Flash)
 Electoral map of Montreal region
 Quebec electoral map, 2011

Kirkland, Quebec
Provincial electoral districts of Montreal
Nelligan
Pierrefonds-Roxboro
L'Île-Bizard–Sainte-Geneviève
1980 establishments in Quebec
Constituencies established in 1980